Billy Young (born 1938 in Dublin) is a former Irish soccer player and manager,

He represented Bohemian F.C. with distinction for nearly 30 years as player, coach and manager and was inducted into their Hall of Fame in November 2007.

Playing career

Young played for Bohemians from 1962 to 1969, captaining the club for the 1965–66 season. He was a tough defender who won an international amateur cap for Ireland against Great Britain in August 1967.

Managerial career
Young broke into management at Athlone Town who were reelected back into the League of Ireland for the first time in 41 years. However, he resigned in December 1969. M

He managed Shamrock Rovers for six months during the 1971–72 season until his dismissal in November 1971.

He returned home to Dalymount when he was appointed manager of the club in July 1973 as successor to Seán Thomas. He held this position for 16 years until he was sacked on 9 November 1989. During this time, he won 2 League of Ireland titles, an FAI Cup, 2 League of Ireland Cups and rarely finished outside the top 4.

He was honoured by the Football Association of Ireland in November 2008.

Honours
League of Ireland: 2
 Bohemians - 1974/75, 1977/78
FAI Cup: 1
 Bohemians - 1976
League of Ireland Cup: 2
 Bohemians - 1975, 1979
PFAI Merit Award
 1999

References

Republic of Ireland association footballers
League of Ireland players
League of Ireland managers
League of Ireland XI managers
Bohemian F.C. players
Bohemian F.C. managers
Shamrock Rovers F.C. managers
Athlone Town A.F.C. managers
Living people
1938 births
Dublin University A.F.C. coaches
Association football defenders
Republic of Ireland football managers
Association football coaches